Bhimsa, the Dancing Bear is a children's novel by Christine Weston. Set in contemporary India, it follows the adventures of two boys, David and Gopali, as they roam the country with a dancing bear. The first edition was illustrated by  Roger Duvoisin.  The novel was first published in 1945 and was a Newbery Honor recipient in 1946.

Reception
Kirkus Reviews called it " A bit out of this world atmosphere and occasionally moralizing -- but in all a satisfactory adventure story" and "The Roger Duvoisin pictures in two colors are sure passport to charm."

References

American children's novels
Books about bears
Novels set in India
Children's novels about animals
Newbery Honor-winning works
1945 American novels
1945 children's books